Aspley is an electoral district of the Legislative Assembly in the Australian state of Queensland.

The district is located in the north-eastern residential suburbs of Brisbane, encompassing Aspley, Bridgeman Downs and Carseldine, as well as parts of McDowall, Chermside West, Lawnton and Zillmere.  It is now wholly within the local government area of Brisbane City Council, following the redistribution prior to the 2009 election.

The electorate was created at the 1959 redistribution from the former electorate of Chermside. Aspley was a safe Liberal seat until the collapse of the National-Liberal coalition in Queensland in 1983, when first-term Liberal member Beryce Nelson lost the seat to the Nationals' Brian Cahill a former local newsreader. Nelson then joined the Nationals and was subsequently preselected to contest Aspley at the 1986 election. She won and held the seat for that term and then was  defeated by the Liberals' John Goss in 1989. Goss was defeated by Labor's Bonny Barry in Labor's landslide victory at the 2001 state election. Barry was herself defeated after three terms by Tracy Davis of the Liberal National Party at the 2009 state election. Davis was defeated at the 2017 state election by Labor's Bart Mellish.

Members for Aspley

Election results

References

External links
 Electorate profile (Antony Green, ABC)

Aspley